Alcidion is a genus of beetles in the family Cerambycidae, containing the following species:

 Alcidion aestimabilis (Melzer, 1934)
 Alcidion albosparsus (Melzer, 1934)
 Alcidion alienum (Melzer, 1932)
 Alcidion apicalis (Bates, 1864)
 Alcidion chryseis (Bates, 1864)
 Alcidion dominicum (Fisher, 1926)
 Alcidion humeralis (Perty, 1832)
 Alcidion inornatum Monne & Monne, 2007
 Alcidion ludicrum (Germar, 1824)
 Alcidion partitum (White, 1855)
 Alcidion quadriguttatum (Aurivillius, 1920)
 Alcidion ramulorum (Bates, 1864)
 Alcidion sannio (Germar, 1824)
 Alcidion sulphurifer (White, 1855)
 Alcidion umbraticum (Jacquelin du Val in Sagra, 1857)
 Alcidion unicolor (Fisher, 1932)

References

 
Acanthocinini